Sandalodus is an extinct genus of cartilaginous fish from the Carboniferous period. It was named by Newberry and Worthen in 1866.

Eastman 1903 gave Cochliodontidae as the parent taxon while Sepkoski 2002 suggested Holocephali.

Species
Sandalodus carbonarius
Sandalodus complanatus
Sandalodus laevissimus

Sources

External links
Paleobiology Database: Sandalodus

Holocephali
Prehistoric cartilaginous fish genera
Carboniferous cartilaginous fish
Carboniferous fish of Asia
Carboniferous fish of North America
Carboniferous fish of Europe
Fossil taxa described in 1866